Cyperus penzoanus is a species of sedge that is native to parts of Africa.

See also 
 List of Cyperus species

References 

penzoanus
Plants described in 1951
Flora of Equatorial Guinea
Flora of Ethiopia
Flora of Kenya
Flora of Tanzania
Flora of Uganda